The Revue Cinema is a cinema in Toronto, Ontario, Canada. Built between late-1911 and early-1912, it is a designated 'heritage' site and is Toronto's oldest standing movie theatre in use for showing movies. When news of its closure became public, a grass-roots community movement sprang up in order to save the cinema. After a great deal of effort, the movement was ultimately successful and the Revue reopened in October 2007. It is now operated by the not-for-profit Revue Film Society.

History 

The Art Deco Edwardian cinema was built between 1911 and 1912 by the Suburban Amusement Company. At the time, Roncesvalles Avenue was on the suburban western edge of the City of Toronto. The area was being developed intensively and the local population was increasing. The cinema was successful and operated as a first-run theatre from its opening date until 1972 when it became a repertory cinema.

In the 1980s, the Revue became part of the Festival Theatres chain of repertory cinemas in Toronto, which also included the Fox, Royal and Kingsway theatres. In 2004, the Festival Theatres founder died, and in April 2006, the founder's family announced their intentions to close all of the theatres except the Fox. The family found it financially impossible to continue due to the rise of DVDs and the shorter period of public exhibition of films available to repertory cinemas. The last show of the Festival era was on June 30, 2006, showing Lawrence of Arabia.

When news of the Revue's closure became public, a grass-roots community movement sprang up in order to save the cinema. The movement founded the Revue Film Society to explore ways to re-open the cinema for film showing. The building's owners put the building up for sale, with the intent to sell to new owners prepared to re-open the cinema.

While the theatre was shut, the marquee, known for its tendency to hold water and snow, collapsed on February 19, 2007, most likely due to the weight of a recent snowfall. Portions of the marquee were placed in storage for eventual restoration.

The movement to save the cinema was ultimately successful. On June 12, 2007, a press conference was held in front of the Revue Cinema, announcing the purchase of the Revue by local residents Danny and Letty Mullin. The Mullins lease the Revue building to the Revue Film Society to operate. The cinema re-opened on October 4, 2007, with a screening of Some Like It Hot.

See also 

 List of cinemas in Toronto
 Roncesvalles, Toronto

References

External links 
 Revue Cinema
 Enright's Theatres of Canada - The Revue Cinema
 Cinema Treasures | Revue Cinema
 Revue Cinema Marquee Collapses

Cinemas and movie theatres in Toronto
Repertory cinemas
1912 establishments in Ontario